The Minister for Infrastructure is a cabinet minister within the Government of Sweden and appointed by the Prime Minister of Sweden.

History
The office was formed in 1920 as the Minister of Communications (Transport) which headed the Ministry of Communications (Transport). The office was renamed to Minister for Infrastructure in 2000.

The minister is responsible for issues regarding railways, rapid transit, roads, bridges, ferries, shipping, sea lanes, ports, aviation, transportation, communication and communication research. The current Minister for Infrastructure is Andreas Carlson, appointed on 18 October 2022.

List of Ministers

References